On 8 March 2012, members of the British military Special Boat Service supported by members of the Nigerian Army attempted a rescue mission to rescue British hostage Chris McManus and Italian hostage Franco Lamolinara from Boko Haram supported by Al Qaeda in Sokoto in north-west Nigeria. The mission failed when both hostages were executed by their captors.

Background
Chris McManus, 28, from Oldham, Greater Manchester was a British contract worker for B Stabilini; an Italian construction company. He was kidnapped on 12 May 2011 in a raid by militants from his apartment in Birnin-Kebbi, along with an Italian colleague Franco Lamolinara, from Gattinara, Piedmont who also worked for B Stabilini. In August 2011 the kidnappers released a hostage video to a Mauritian news agency, threatening to kill McManus and Lamolinara unless demands were met.

They were kidnapped by militants calling themselves "al-Qaida in the land beyond the Sahil". British and Nigerian officials and news sources say that they were members of Boko Haram backed by Al Qaeda, who received training in Niger from al Qaeda in the Maghreb. The militants demands constantly changed; they wanted the Nigerian government to release prisoners, but kept changing specific prisoners they wanted released.

Intelligence
Following their kidnapping, the British authorities and agencies worked closely with Nigerian authorities to find the hostages.

On 6 March 2012, Nigerian security agencies arrested Abu Mohammed; the factional leader of Boko haram and 4 other members of the sect. They showed the security agencies the compound in the Mabera neighbourhood of Sokoto where the hostages were holed up and raised concern that the hostages might be killed if the security agencies did not move quickly to free the hostages. Also, an intercepted phone call from the militants suggested that they were going to move and execute the hostages after they suspected something was wrong due to their leader and the four others being missing.

The COBRA committee met to monitor the situation, GCHQ monitored phone calls and used satellite technology to confirm their location and passed on the intelligence to the Director of Special Forces who passed it to the SBS commander in Nigeria. On Thursday morning, 8 March 2012, David Cameron authorised the emergency rescue mission after being informed of their location.

The Italian government was not informed of the rescue mission until it was underway.

Mission
Personnel from the British SBS (Special Boat Service) supported by their counterparts in the Nigerian Army launched the operation to free the hostages at 10am (British standard time). The SBS Squadron had been in the country for up to two weeks, they could not use helicopters to assault the building because they would have alerted the kidnappers, they were instead transported to the target building in Nigerian vehicles. Some news reports put the number of SBS troops who carried out the raid at 6 to 8, whilst others put the number at 16 to 20. The assault was brief, a Nigerian Army APC rammed the gates of the target compound, the SBS then stormed the building and killed two militants whilst Nigerian troops killed a further 6 militants. The bodies of McManus and Lamolinara were found, an autopsy revealed that they had been hastily executed at close range.

Aftermath
Following the raid, gunfire continued into the night and a further two or three militants were arrested. The raid strained relations between the United Kingdom and Italy, the Italian government has demanded an explanation from British government as to why it was not informed about the rescue attempt. Italy's prime minister asked the Nigerian government for a detailed reconstruction of the events leading to the hostages death.

See also
Bulo Marer hostage rescue attempt
Burkina Faso hostage rescue
2020 Nigeria hostage rescue

References

Hostage rescue operations
Operations involving British special forces
Special Boat Service operations
March 2012 events in Africa
2012 in Nigeria
Hostage taking in Nigeria